Brendan Hughes (1948–2008) was an Irish republican.

Brendan Hughes may also refer to:
Brendan Patrick Hughes (director, podcaster), American director and podcast host
Brendan Hughes (EastEnders), character from EastEnders
Brendan Hughes (politician), Canadian politician